Yauyos District is one of thirty-three districts of the Yauyos Province in Peru.

Geography 
Other mountains are listed below:

References